David Norman Schramm (October 25, 1945 – December 19, 1997) was an American astrophysicist and educator, and one of the world's foremost experts on the Big Bang theory. Schramm was a pioneer in establishing particle astrophysics as a vibrant research field.  He was particularly well known for the study of Big Bang nucleosynthesis and its use as a probe of dark matter (both baryonic and non-baryonic) and of neutrinos. He also made important contributions to the study of cosmic rays, supernova explosions, heavy-element nucleosynthesis, and nuclear astrophysics generally.

Biography 

David Schramm was born in St. Louis, Missouri and earned his master's degree in physics from the Massachusetts Institute of Technology in 1967, where he was also a member of the Delta Upsilon fraternity and the wrestling squad. He earned a Ph.D in physics at Caltech in 1971 under Willy Fowler and Gerry Wasserburg. After a brief time as faculty at the University of Texas at Austin where he also played Prop for the Austin Huns Rugby Club alongside Pat Lochridge, he accepted a professorship at the University of Chicago, where he spent the rest of his career.

Schramm received the Robert J. Trumpler Award of the Astronomical Society of the Pacific in 1974, the Helen B. Warner Prize for Astronomy from the American Astronomical Society in 1978, and he was awarded the Julius Edgar Lilienfeld Prize from the American Physical Society in 1993. He was elected to the National Academy of Sciences in 1986.

Schramm, an avid private pilot, died on 19 December 1997, when his Swearingen-Fairchild SA-226 crashed near Denver, Colorado. He was the sole occupant of the  aircraft. The National Transportation Safety Board found the cause to be pilot error.  At the time of his death he was Vice President for Research and Louis Block Distinguished Service Professor in the Physical Sciences at the University of Chicago.

Legacy 

The David N. Schramm Award for High Energy Astrophysics Science Journalism was created in his honour in the year 2000 by the High-Energy Astrophysics Division of the American Astronomical Society. Fermilab hosts the David Schramm Fellowship in theoretical or experimental astrophysics. Schramm also leaves a legacy of former graduate students and postdocs, many of whom work in astrophysics around the world, including Brian Fields (Professor of Astronomy and Physics at the University of Illinois), Katherine Freese (George Uhlenbeck Professor at the University of Michigan and Director of Nordita, the Nordic Institute for Theoretical Physics in Stockholm), Craig Hogan (Professor of Astronomy and Physics at the University of Chicago and Director of the Fermilab Center for Astroparticle Physics), James Lattimer (Distinguished Professor of Astronomy, SUNY Stony Brook), Angela Olinto (Chair, Department of Astronomy and Astrophysics at University of Chicago), Keith Olive (Director of the William I Fine Theoretical Physics Institute at the University of Minnesota), and many others. Asteroid 113952 Schramm, discovered by the Sloan Digital Sky Survey at Apache Point Observatory in 2002, was named in his memory. The official  was published by the Minor Planet Center on 30 January 2010.

References

External links
Guide to the David N. Schramm Papers 1960-1998 at the University of Chicago Special Collections Research Center
Michael S. Turner, "David Norman Schramm", Biographical Memoirs of the National Academy of Sciences (2009)

1945 births
1997 deaths
American astrophysicists
Physicists from Missouri
Scientists from Missouri
Scientists from St. Louis
MIT Department of Physics alumni
California Institute of Technology alumni
University of Chicago faculty
Aviators killed in aviation accidents or incidents in the United States
Accidental deaths in Colorado
20th-century American physicists
20th-century American astronomers
Fellows of the American Physical Society
Victims of aviation accidents or incidents in 1997